The 2018 Ladies European Tour was a series of golf tournaments for elite female golfers from around the world, which took place from 1 February to 25 November. The tournaments were sanctioned by the Ladies European Tour (LET).

Schedule
The table below shows the 2018 schedule. The numbers in brackets after the winners' names indicate the career wins on the Ladies European Tour, including that event, and is only shown for members of the tour.

Key

Unofficial events
The following event appeared on the schedule, but did not carry official money.

Order of Merit rankings

Source:

See also
2018 LPGA Tour

References

External links
Official site of the Ladies European Tour
2018 Ladies European Tour Tournaments 

Ladies European Tour
Ladies European Tour
Ladies European Tour